"The Tale of Eric and the Dread Gazebo" is a role-playing game-inspired anecdote, made famous by Richard Aronson (designer of The Ruins of Cawdor, a graphical MUD, and the voice of Cedric in King's Quest V). Aronson's account first appeared in print in the APA Alarums and Excursions between 1985 and 1986. It was reprinted in Mensa's RPG APA The Spell Book in 1987, and The Mensa Bulletin in 1988. It subsequently spread to the internet where it has been frequently retold and adapted as short stories and comics. The story, as it was originally published, was titled "Eric and the Gazebo" but many retellings inserted the word 'Dread' in the title.

The tale features a player who misunderstands the gamemaster's description of a gazebo on a small hill, mistakenly assuming it to be some kind of monster in the game. After asking the gamemaster its color, size and distance from the group, the player attempts to call out to the gazebo. When it fails to respond, he fires an arrow at it, to no effect. ("There is now a gazebo with an arrow sticking out of it.") By the end of the encounter the player, lacking the means to harm the gazebo, opts to flee in desperation. The frustrated game master retaliates by humouring the player's misconception and announcing that the gazebo has awakened to capture and consume the player.

According to Ed Whitchurch (the real gamemaster of the story) the original incident on which the anecdote is based, was actually less than a minute long, ending rather unceremoniously with Whitchurch asking "Don't you know what a gazebo is?"

The Dread Gazebo in popular culture
The first issue of the comic book Knights of the Dinner Table contains a retelling of the story (and makes a similar reference to a davenport in a Flash animated short).
A gazebo features prominently in the winter 2006 issues of Nodwick. 
A Gazebo monster card appears in the Munchkin card game; Aronson told Steve Jackson the story in the mid 1990s. 
A base called The Dread Gazebo also features in the Awesome Level 9000 expansion for the Smash Up game by AEG. 
In the MMORPG RuneScape, examination of a player-constructed gazebo results in the message "Run for it! It's a gazebo!"
Godville has a "dreaded gazebo" in its lore, which is a monster that can be tamed.
During a side-quest in Final Fantasy XIV: Heavensward, a character exclaims "A gazebo! Aren't those dangerous!? Then again, you seem a responsible sort--not like to let a wild gazebo run amok."

See also
 Don Quixote#Tilting at windmills
 Mental model

References

History of role-playing games
Humour
Gazebos